Enzo Couacaud and Albano Olivetti were the defending champions but chose not to defend their title.

Denys Molchanov and David Vega Hernández won the title after defeating Romain Arneodo and Matt Reid 6–4, 6–2 in the final.

Seeds

Draw

References

External links
 Main draw

JC Ferrero Challenger Open - Doubles